Funhouse is a 2019 horror film directed and written by Jason William Lee. The film stars Valter Skarsgård as Kaspar, a washed up reality TV star who is duped into taking part in a reality show where the losers are killed in brutal ways.

Synopsis
Eight people (reality show star Kasper, bride-to-be personality Lonnie, chess master, actress and martial arts star Cat Zim, Instagram personality Ula, Youtuber Nevin, singer Dex, TV personality Headstone, and blogger Ximena) known for being reality show stars and social media personalities have been invited to take part in a new reality show hosted by a CGI panda named Furcas. They will be filmed 24/7 and contestants can vote for which people they like the most. Every three days the contestant with the lowest number of votes must take part in a penalty game and if they lose, they are out of the running. If two contestants ties or nearly tie for the lowest number of votes, they must compete against each other in the penalty games. If they try to leave the house, they will be penalized and removed from the game.

Unbeknownst to the contestants, the show is run by Nero Alexander, a wealthy and sociopathic man who is willing to pay people to commit murder and atrocities for his entertainment. Nero is also controlling the Furcas CGI. The penalty games are actually a matter of life or death, as the odds are high that the games will result in a gruesome death. Prior to the first elimination, the contestants all generally treat the show as they would any other, despite clues that something is obviously wrong. For the first elimination, Lonni and Nevin are forced to participate in the game while the others watch in a soundproofed room. Lonni is blindfolded and instructed to smash a "piñata" while very loud music plays. As she is blindfolded, she is unable to tell that the "piñata" is actually a gagged Nevin and unwittingly beats him to death. After the first death, viewers and media outlets debate whether the show is real or fake. The ex-wife of Kasper is brought on a news talk show, where she pleads for his return and for viewers to stop watching the livestream. In the show house, Dex unsuccessfully tries to leave and is forced to stand in a container of acid until he dies.

As the game continues, every few days, one of the contestants is forced to participate in games and face a gruesome death when they lose. Ula is forced to fight Ximena to the death. She kills Ximena, but then fails in the next round and is torn apart. During all of this, some of the contestants grow closer together, such as Kaspar and Lonnie, while others crack under the pressure. The FBI is also trying to find the location of the reality show. At one point, Kaspar questions Furcas's reasoning for the torture, only for the host to berate him for being known as the ex-husband of a pop star and a failed reality show star. In the next round, Headstone is killed off, leaving Kaspar, Lonnie, and Cat Zim remaining. Kaspar and Lonnie eventually give into their mutual attraction and make love, Cat Zim tries to redeem herself by pleasuring herself, but it still fails, which results in Cat receiving the lowest ratings. Cat's challenge requires that she play a game of chess against Furcas. She loses and must spin a wheel to select her punishment. The wheel selects "Pass the Buck", which allows her to survive by making another contestant play a punishment game. Kaspar volunteers to go in Lonnie's stead, however Furcas forces both to participate in a game of dueling pistols. The FBI manages to track the signal and goes to what they believe is the right location, only to instead find a small container filled with the heads of the other contestants. Refusing to participate, Lonnie and Kaspar share a kiss and then turned their guns on themselves. Leaving Cat as the only person left alive, she wins the game and is given the prize money.

Cat escapes the home and makes her way to a nearby road, where she is rescued. She is questioned by the police about the deaths, but ultimately released. The FBI raids the house, but find only bodies. Cat Zim makes her way to Nero's home, where it is revealed that she was complicit in the entire scheme. It is implied that she was always intended to be the sole survivor, as she tells him that she will not let him win at chess "next time".

Cast
 Valter Skarsgård as Kasper Norden
 Khamisa Wilsher as Lonni Byrne
 Gigi Saul Guerrero as Ximena Torrez
 Christopher Gerard as James "Headstone" Malone
 Karolina Benefield as Ula Lamore
 Amanda Howells as Cat Zim
 Mathias Retamal as Dex 
 Dayleigh Nelson as Nevin Eversmith
 Jerome Velinsky as Nero Alexander
 Kylee Bush as Darla Drake
 Debs Howard as Gilda 'The Mad' Batter

Production
TBA

Release
Funhouse first premiered in 2019. It received a VOD and limited theatrical release on May 28, 2021, through Magnet Releasing.

Reception
Critical reception for Funhouse has been negative. The movie holds a rating of 0% on Rotten Tomatoes, based on 15 reviews. Common criticisms for the film centered upon the characters and the script.

Simon Abrams of RogerEbert.com gave the film a score of 0/4 stars, criticizing the characters as "meat puppet protagonists, none of whom are more sympathetic than their inhospitable circumstances", while also stating "What’s the point in watching a feel-bad movie about simulated violence when the gore and gamesmanship are as perfunctory and vapid as Nero’s lazy button-pushing speeches?". Chuck Bowen of Slant Magazine criticized Lee for not taking enough chances with the script, writing that "If Lee had the daring to consciously dehumanize his sacrificial lambs, or to allow them to more consistently dehumanize themselves for the sake of life-saving votes, Funhouse may have had enough sick punch to transcend its general obviousness. Lee broaches this idea but doesn’t commit to it."

References

External links
 

2019 horror films
Canadian horror films
Swedish horror films
Films about technology
Torture in films
Films about social media
Films about death games
2010s English-language films
English-language Canadian films
English-language Swedish films
2010s Canadian films
2010s Swedish films